Boulogne-Tintelleries is a railway station serving the historic centre of Boulogne. It opened on May 1, 1893, is located on the Boulogne–Calais railway and served by the SNCF local TER Hauts-de-France.

Services

The station is served by regional trains to Calais, Boulogne-Ville and Amiens.

References

Railway stations in Pas-de-Calais
Railway stations in France opened in 1893
Boulogne-sur-Mer